Spiegelbild is the fifth studio EP released by the Neue Deutsche Härte band Unheilig.  It was released on July 25, 2008. It was strictly limited to 3,333 copies.

Track listing 
 "Spiegelbild (Extended Version)" - 7:03
 "Spiegelbild (Krupps Remix)" - 5:09
 "Schlaflos" - 4:18
 "Die Alte Leier" - 4:18
 "Hexenjagd" - 4:22
 "An Deiner Seite (Orchester Version)" - 6:13
 "Spiegelbild (Album Version)" - 5:36

2008 EPs